Lake Merritt station is an underground Bay Area Rapid Transit (BART) station located east of Downtown Oakland near the eponymous Lake Merritt. It is the nearest BART station to Chinatown, Laney College, and Jack London Square station.

History 

The construction of Lake Merritt station and the adjacent BART Administration Building leveled three blocks of Chinatown – one of several major displacements in the area, along with I-880, Laney College, and the Oakland Museum of California, that took place in the mid-20th century. The station opened on September 11, 1972 – part of the first section of BART to open.

A largely-unused oval courtyard adjacent to the fare lobby includes reliefs of sea creatures and birds designed by William Mitchell. Now-closed portholes in the reliefs allowed the public to peer into the BART Operations Control Center. Walls in the station feature tile work in red, black, and off-white by Alfonso Pardiñas.

The BART Administration Building was located in a dedicated six-story office building constructed concurrently on top of the station. In 2003, due to potential risk of earthquake damage, the headquarters was moved away from the station to leased space in the Kaiser Center. The former Administration Building was dismantled in 2009 and 2010.

Bathrooms at underground BART stations were closed after the September 11 attacks due to security concerns. The bathroom at Lake Meritt station reopened on June 28, 2022, after a renovation, with an attendant on duty during all operating hours. On September 8, 2022, the BART Board approved plans for a 457-unit residential development to replace the station parking lot, with two additional phases planned.

Station layout 
The station has a single island platform located two levels below ground, with a fare mezzanine above it. The station has four entrances from Oak Street between 8th Street and 9th Street.

References

External links 

BART – Lake Merritt

Bay Area Rapid Transit stations in Alameda County, California
Stations on the Orange Line (BART)
Stations on the Green Line (BART)
Stations on the Blue Line (BART)
Railway stations in Oakland, California
Railway stations in the United States opened in 1972
Railway stations in California at university and college campuses